The 18th Annual petit Le Mans presented by Mazda was the 2015 version of the Petit Le Mans automotive endurance race, was held on October 1st-3rd 2015 at the Road Atlanta circuit in Braselton, Georgia. This was the second Petit Le Mans in the United SportsCar Championship. The race was rain shorted for the second time with only eight hours of racing instead of the maximum 10 hours. The race was won overall by Richard Lietz, Patrick Pilet, and Nick Tandy in the #911 Porsche North America Porsche 911 RSR. Originally scheduled to run for 10 hours, the race was concluded after 8 hours (199 laps) were completed due to heavy rain, darkness, visibility, and hydroplaning. This marked the first time in the events history that a GT car won overall.

Entry list
The official entry list consisted of 37 cars, including 9 in prototype, 8 in prototype challenge, 8 in GTLM and 12 in GTD.

Qualifying 
Richard Westbrook secured overall pole for the event.

Qualifying results 

  The No. 912 Porsche North America entry had its fastest lap deleted as penalty for causing a red flag during its qualifying session.

Results 

References

Petit Le Mans
Petit Le Mans
Motorsport in Georgia (U.S. state)